Culto ocultO (often called CultoocultO) is an experimental music band from Venezuela and Spain.

History

Culto ocultO is a Venezuelan rock band, founded in 1989 by guitarist José Henriquez, bass player Sydney "Gato" Reyes and keyboard player Ricardo Da Silva Typically categorised as a foundational an experimental, dark and progressive rock group. The band has in fact incorporated diverse influences and instrumentation during its long history, drawing from jazz, classical to psychedelic rock, new wave, hard rock, gamelan, folk music, electronica and drum and bass. 

Its first album Flotar no es mas que existir.. un movimiento ondulatorio was released in 1996. The second album Baralt000mix was released in 2000. Both albums were published by Plutonrecords. The third album Blanco was released by Plutonrecords in 2002  and re-released by FTS-Records in 2006. In 2003, the band toured in Spain and Portugal as part of Blanco Tour 2003. After the European tour, band members ceased its activities beginning new musical projects. 

In 2007, Culto Oculto performed a special show at15th Sziget Festival 2007 in Budapest, Hungary. 

The band made a special presentation in January, 2010 in Caracas, Venezuela announcing they are working in a new album.

Band members
José Henriquez, guitar, first vocal, computers
Sydney Reyes (a.k.a. "Gato"), bass, vocal, computers
José Juan Sanguinetti, drums
Paulo M. De Oliveira, keyboards and computers

Additional/guest musicians
Rafael Martinez, Percussion
Angela Gugliotta, Percussion
José "Pinguino" Echezuria, guitar and producer
Jorge Ramirez, guitar and producer

former members
Rafael "tato" Monsalve, drums
Andres Rangel, drums
Ricardo Da Silva, keyboards and vocal
Guiomar Márquez, vocal

Discography
Flotar no es mas que existir.. un movimiento ondulatorio (1996)
Baralt000mix (2000)
Blanco (2002)

External links
CultoocultO official website
  CultoocultO myspace website
 CultoocultO official blog
CDBaby's review
Indyrock's review
 Itunes
 Emusic

Venezuelan musical groups
Venezuelan rock music groups
Musical groups established in 1989
Musical quartets
1989 establishments in Venezuela